Michael C. Lawrence (born September 14, 1943) is an English writer for children and young adults. His work most widely held in WorldCat libraries is the 2003 novel A Crack in the Line, first in a trilogy called The Aldous Lexicon, or Withern Rise in the United States. Much of the Jiggy McCue series of sixteen books is widely held in participating libraries. His only known website active in 2022 is that of the graphics artist McLaw.

Biography 
Michael Lawrence was born in Huntingdonshire, England. His family moved to Sudbury, Middlesex when he was four. In his teens he attended Ealing School of Art before working in London as a graphic designer and photographer. Later, Lawrence became an art and antiques dealer, but when he sold a novel (When the Snow Falls, published in 1995), he decided to concentrate on writing for young people. When the Snow Falls was later rewritten and recast for older readers as A Crack in the Line, the first novel in The Withern Rise Trilogy. He also co-authored The Poppykettle Papers with Robert Ingpen, and his book Young Dracula and Young Monsters was the basis for the CBBC television series Young Dracula.

Bibliography

Jiggy McCue
The Poltergoose  (1999), republished as The Curse of the Poltergoose (2009)
The Killer Underpants (2000) 
The Toilet of Doom (2001)
Maggot Pie (2002), republished as The Meanest Genie (2009)
The Snottle (2003)
Nudie Dudie (2004)
Neville the Devil (2005)
Ryan's Brain (2006)
The Iron, the Switch and the Broom Cupboard (2007)
Kid Swap (2008)
One for All and All for Lunch (2009)
Rudie Dudie (2010)
Evilution: The Troof (2011) World Book Day 2011
Murder & Chips (2012)Jiggy's Genes
 Jiggy's Magic Balls (2010)
 Jiggy the Vampire Slayer (2011)
 Jiggy and the Witchfinder (Released Sept 2011)

Withern Rise/Aldous LexiconA Crack in the Line  (2003)Small Eternities  (2004)The Underwood See  (2006)

OtherWhen the Snow Falls (1995)The Griffin and Oliver Pie  (2006)Milking the Novelty, a personal memoir  (2005)Young Dracula and Young Monsters  (2006)Juby's Rook  (2007)Hero 41: Eye of the Gargoyle (Sam Penant, pseudonym) (2014)Hero 41: The People in the Wall'' (Sam Penant, pseudonym) (2015)

References

External links

 
 Official website as children's writer (archived 2018-06-16)
 
 
Michael Lawrence at Fantastic Fiction

Living people
English writers
Place of birth missing (living people)
1943 births